The First Barbarians: Live from Kilburn is a concert album plus DVD by Ronnie Wood and band. The material was recorded and filmed in July 1974 at one of two performances at London's Kilburn Gaumont State Theatre to promote Wood's album I've Got My Own Album to Do.

At the time of the concert the band was billed as Woody and Friends. The name First Barbarians is an allusion to The New Barbarians, the band Wood put together for a six-week tour in 1979, whose lineup included three of the musicians who played at the July 1974 Kilburn gigs (Wood, Keith Richards and Ian McLagan).

Track listing

CD
 "Intro" - instrumental
 "Am I Grooving You" (Bert Russell, Jeff Barry)
 "Cancel Everything" (Ronnie Wood)
 "Mystifies Me" (Wood) - with Rod Stewart sharing vocals
 "Take a Look at the Guy" (Wood) - with Rod Stewart vocals
 "Act Together" (Jagger, Richards)
 "Shirley" (Wood)
 "Forever" (Wood)
 "Sure the One You Need" (Jagger, Richards) - Keith Richards on lead vocals
 "I Can't Stand the Rain" (Don Bryant, Ann Peebles, Bernard Miller)
 "Crotch Music" (Willie Weeks) - instrumental
 "I Can Feel the Fire" (Wood)

DVD
 "Intro" 
 "Am I Grooving You"
 "Cancel Everything"
 "If You Gotta Make a Fool of Somebody" (Rudy Clark) - with Rod Stewart sharing vocals
 "Mystifies Me" 
 "Take a Look at the Guy" 
 "Act Together"
 "Shirley"
 "Forever"
 "Sure the One You Need"
 "Crotch Music"
 "I Can Feel the Fire"

Personnel
Ronnie Wood – guitar, vocals
Keith Richards – guitar, piano, vocals
Willie Weeks – bass guitar
Ian McLagan – piano, organ
Andy Newmark – drums
Rod Stewart - vocals

References

Ronnie Wood albums
2007 live albums
2007 video albums
Live video albums